The Wiscoy Sandstone is a geologic formation in New York. It preserves fossils dating back to the Devonian period.

See also

 List of fossiliferous stratigraphic units in New York

References
 
 
 

Geologic formations of New York (state)